Avanti Fields School is a Hindu faith all-through school in Leicester, United Kingdom that is part of the Avanti Schools Trust.

History
The school opened in 2018 in temporary accommodation on Narborough Road before moving to its permeant site in the Humberstone area of the city in September 2021.

Curriculum
Avanti schools aim to promote "educational excellence, character formation and spiritual insight." Avanti schools follow the standard national curriculum of the government-run schools of the United Kingdom. In addition to the standard curriculum, Avanti schools feature Sanskrit language teaching, meditation and yoga practice, ethics and philosophy education, and inclusive religious instruction. Religious education is evenly split between Hinduism and other world religions.

See also
 Krishna Avanti Primary School, Leicester
 International Society for Krishna Consciousness

References

External links
Official website

Primary schools in Leicester
Secondary schools in Leicester
Hindu schools in the United Kingdom
Schools affiliated with the International Society for Krishna Consciousness
International Society for Krishna Consciousness
Free Schools in England with a Formal Faith Designation
Free schools in England